Hell Is Here is the third album by Swedish death/thrash metal band The Crown. It was the first album to be originally released with the name "The Crown" instead of the previous name "Crown of Thorns", changed due to legal reasons.

Track listing
"The Poison" - 3:17
"At the End" - 4:41
"1999-Revolution 666" - 5:20
"Dying of the Heart" - 5:57
"Electric Night" - 2:32
"Black Lightning" - 3:25
"The Devil and the Darkness" - 4:52
"Give You Hell" - 2:53
"Body and Soul" - 3:11
"Mysterion" - 3:28
"Death by My Side" - 7:27

References

The Crown (band) albums
1999 albums
Metal Blade Records albums